Willughbeia sarawacensis, commonly known as kubal or kubal madu (Malaysia) and tabo (Philippines), is a large tropical vine-bearing plant with edible fruit native to Borneo and to the nearby island of Palawan in the Philippines. There are four related varieties known in Borneo: kubal asam or kubal taya, kubal tusu or kubal madu, kubal arang (all fall under Willughbeia sarawakensis), and another much bigger cousin tabau (Willughbeia elimeri).

Description
The fruit is the shape, size, and colour of a grapefruit with a thin melon-like rind and a concentrated sweet taste comparable to mango, soursop and pineapple combined. At the government experimental station near Kuching, Sarawak, they are grown on elevated platforms and said to start producing in less than two years. All four are round in shape except kubal tusu, which is pear-shaped. Kubal arang (charcoal) has a distinctive charcoal-coloured seed.

References

External links
 Sarawak Forestry

sarawacensis
Plants described in 1898
Tropical fruit
Flora of Borneo
Flora of Palawan
Fruits originating in Asia